The Kawasaki Ninja ZX-7R was a motorcycle in the Ninja sport bike series from the Japanese manufacturer Kawasaki produced from 1989 until 2003. It remained largely unchanged through its production. Kawasaki used inverted forks starting in 1991, added ram air using a single tube, and in 1996, twin tube ram air and Tokico six piston brakes and fully adjustable suspension.
From 1989 through 1995 in the US market, Kawasaki called the ZXR-750 and ZXR-750R the ZX-7 and ZX-7R respectively. Starting from 1996 Kawasaki dropped the ZXR name worldwide and the former ZXR-750 was now ZX-7R and the limited edition homologation special ZXR-750R/ZX-7R started in 1991 was now ZX-7RR.

Overview
The ZX-7R has a 749 cc in-line four-cylinder, four-stroke engine.

The frame used on the ZX-7R is a lightweight aluminum twin-spar item, designed using computer-aided design to optimize strength. The rear subframe was constructed using steel, providing enough strength for a pillion passenger.

The swingarm used largely the same fabrication techniques to produce a hollow cast and pressed aluminum alloy hybrid swingarm, and the Uni-Trak rear suspension system features a predominantly lightweight alloy and aluminum construction. The Uni-Trak system was designed to provide a progressively stiffer damping and spring rate under compression. The rear suspension unit is fully adjustable in terms of damping, preload and compression.

The front suspension found on the ZX-7R comprises a fully adjustable 8-way compression and 12-way rebound 43 mm inverted cartridge fork.

Front brakes are 320 mm semi-floating front discs and Tokico six-piston calipers. Rear brakes feature a 230 mm disc with a twin-piston opposed caliper.

The ZX-7RR differs from the road model with an adjustable head-stock angle, swing arm pivot, additional increased adjustability 28-way compression and 13-way rebound to the front and 14-way rebound for the rear suspension, ten more than the R model, a solo cowl with a different aluminum subframe, and 41 mm flat-slide carburetors versus the 38mm on the base R model. It also has a close ratio gear-box fitted as standard and a crankshaft flywheel that is heavier and Nissin front brake calipers.

Racing
The ZX-7RR was raced, winning 12 AMA superbike championships. Kawasaki's Road Racing team riders were Eric Bostrom, Doug Chandler and Scott Russell. Doug Toland won the 1993 Endurance FIM World Championship. Andreas Hofmann won the 1997 Macau Grand Prix.

References

Ninja ZX-7R
Sport bikes
Motorcycles introduced in 1995